Stolen Babies are a United states experimental rock band consisting of vocalist/accordionist Dominique Lenore Persi, bassist/guitarist Rani Sharone, and drummer Gil Sharone.

History
Stolen Babies formed from a 12+ member high school performance troupe named The Fratellis; the band takes its name from one of the skits performed by the group during this period (written by Dominique Persi and her older brother, animator Raymond S. Persi). Stolen Babies released their first demo CD through their own label, No Comment Records.

Among the band's many musical influences are groups such as Oingo Boingo, Mr. Bungle, Cop Shoot Cop, and Fishbone (with whom Gil Sharone has performed). Stolen Babies are known for their unclassifiable odd rock and heavy, energetic performances. Except for the earliest demo, each album has featured artwork by indie comic artist Crab Scrambly.

There Be Squabbles Ahead, the band's debut full-length album (featuring remixed versions of "A Year of Judges" and "Push Button" from the 2004 demo), was released early in 2006 through the band's website, but was re-released on October 3 through The End Records. This album was produced by Dan Rathbun, member of the similarly "avant garde" experimental rock group Sleepytime Gorilla Museum, who also provides instrumentation on track 7 (tuba) as well as various background vocals on tracks 3, 7, and 12. Carla Kihlstedt (from Sleepytime Gorilla Museum) also contributed violin on tracks 7 and 11. The re-release also featured a music video for the song "Push Button" directed by Erik Tillmans. This album also marked the departure of Davin Givhan, the band's former guitarist. Guitarist George Earth, formerly of Switchblade Symphony, took Givhan's place during the international tour that followed.

They supported Lacuna Coil alongside Within Temptation and The Gathering on their The Hottest Chicks in Metal Tour 2007 featuring female-fronted metal bands.

According to an interview with Vampire Freaks their new album titled "Naught" was released October 16, 2012. From September 4 to 24, the band participated in the Epic Kings & Idols tour, supporting Devin Townsend, Katatonia, and Paradise Lost. They also participated in the "With a Vengeance" tour, in support of Otep, alongside New Years Day and Lydia Can't Breathe. The tour began on September 20, 2013 in Fresno, California, and ended on November 9 in Los Angeles, California.

On July 3, 2020, Stolen Babies released the single "Stolen Babies" on Bandcamp. It was their first new song released in eight years. 

On October 30, 2021 they released a cover of the theme song to the stop-motion animated film Mad Monster Party? on Bandcamp.

Line-up

Current members
Dominique Lenore Persi – lead vocals, accordion
Rani Sharone – bass, guitar, upright bass, backing vocals
Gil Sharone – drums, percussion
Ben Rico – keyboards, percussion, backing vocals

Former members 
Davin Givhan – guitar
Darling Freakhead – guitar
Arleena DeLaCruz- drummer

Discography

Albums
 2002: Stolen Babies EP
 2004: 4-song demo (out of print)
 2006: There Be Squabbles Ahead
 2012: Naught

Side projects
Dominique Lenore Persi has played with indie pop-folk polka artist Horace Weintraub, and has lent her accordion-playing skills to many of his recordings.

Gil Sharone was a replacement drummer for +44 on their tours of Europe, Australia and Japan in early 2007.

Dominique Lenore Persi and Rani Sharone are participants in the Immersion Composition Society. They are members of the Los Angeles sect, Lodge of 1,000 Names.

Gil and Rani Sharone have played with Puscifer, the side project of Tool's frontman, Maynard James Keenan. In 2013, Rani Sharone remixed "The Green Valley" for Puscifer's "All Re-Mixed Up" remix album. The song features Rani as well as Gil on drums and Dominique on accordion.

Gil Sharone handled drum duties for the album Ire Works by The Dillinger Escape Plan, following the departure of Chris Pennie (who left to join Coheed and Cambria; with whom he has since parted ways). Gil Sharone was the permanent drummer for The Dillinger Escape Plan from 2007 to 2008 but left the band to have time for his other projects including a DVD on Reggae drumming and Stolen Babies.

Gil Sharone was the drummer of Marilyn Manson from 2014 to 2019. He played drums on the Marilyn Manson albums The Pale Emperor (2015) and Heaven Upside Down (2017).  

Dominique Lenore Persi appeared on the album Z² by Canadian musician Devin Townsend, as well as the Radioactive Chicken Heads 2017 album Tales from the Coop.

References

External links

 Official website
 Thrashocore Interview (promoted on myspace as a "reference interview")

Heavy metal musical groups from California
American avant-garde metal musical groups
Musical groups established in 2002
2002 establishments in California